Anastasia Myskina was the defending champion, but chose not to participate that year.

Martina Hingis won the title, defeating Olga Poutchkova 6–0, 6–4 in the final.

Seeds

Results

Finals

Top half

Bottom half

Qualifying

Seeds

Qualifiers

Draw

First qualifier

Second qualifier

Third qualifier

Fourth qualifier

References

External links
Singles Draw
Draws at WTA archive

2006 WTA Tour
Sunfeast Open